Lips: I Love the 80s (Stylised as Lips: I ♥ the 80s) is a karaoke game for the Xbox 360 games console, and the third follow-up to Lips. Like the other entries in the series, the game uses motion-sensitive wireless microphones, but like Lips: Party Classics it is compatible with USB microphones. It was only released in Europe.

The game also adds 250 Gamerscore to Lips, taking the total Gamerscore for the Lips series to 1750. However, the game was not released in North America making the last 250 unobtainable to western audiences. All songs from the disc could be purchased on the Marketplace instead but none to unlock the additional score. The game is region-free making it possible to be played on a NTSC console thus allowing North Americans to complete the game alongside European gamers.

Track list 

As the title suggests, all 40 songs on this game are from the 1980s.

See also
SingStar
UltraStar – An open-source clone of the SingStar engine
Rock Band
Guitar Hero World Tour
Karaoke Revolution
Karaoke Revolution (2009 video game)
Guitar Hero 5
The Beatles: Rock Band
Lips (video game)
Lips: Number One Hits
Lips: Party Classics

External links
 Mobygames profile of Lips: I ♥ the 80s

2010 video games
Microsoft games
Karaoke video games
Music video games
Video games developed in Japan
Xbox 360-only games
Xbox 360 games
Lips (video game)
Multiplayer and single-player video games